David Ramsey Foster, DSO, DSC and bar (24 May 1920 – 4 June 2010) was a decorated pilot in the British Royal Navy during World War II and a business executive.

Early life and education
David Ramsey Foster was born on 24 May 1920 in London to American parents Robert Bagley Foster, an Olympian swimmer, and Josephine Pontius Foster (née Ramsey). His sister, Phoebe Louise Foster, married Lieutenant Osbert Stephen Boothby, the son of Commander William Osbert Boothby MVO RN, on 21 June 1938.

Foster was educated first at Stowe School and then at Gonville and Caius, Cambridge, where he studied economics and graduated in 1938.

Career
Once World War II had come to an end, Lieutenant-Commander David Foster had served in both the Western Desert and the Pacific theatres, and had received both the DSO and DSC and Bar.

Foster joined Colgate-Palmolive after the war. He rose to become president in 1970 and chairman in 1975.

Personal life
Foster married three times. On 1 February 1952 in Manhattan, New York, he married actress and divorcee Glynis Johns. They divorced on 17 May 1956 and on 2 August 1957 he married Anne Firth, with whom he had two daughters. Finally, he married Alexandra Chang on 24 May 1996.

He died on 4 June 2010 in Brimfield, Massachusetts.

References

1920 births
2010 deaths
Royal Navy officers
Alumni of Gonville and Caius College, Cambridge
Fleet Air Arm aviators
English people of American descent
Colgate-Palmolive
Companions of the Distinguished Service Order
People educated at Stowe School
Place of death missing
Royal Navy officers of World War II
Recipients of the Distinguished Service Cross (United Kingdom)
Military personnel from London
Fleet Air Arm personnel of World War II
20th-century English businesspeople